J. P. S. Uberoi (Jit Pal Singh Uberoi / JPS Uberoi; born 1934) is an Indian sociologist and philosophical anthropologist. He retired as a professor of Sociology from the Delhi School of Economics, New Delhi, India. He is best known for establishing an alternative paradigm in the Indian social sciences, which inaugurates the space for a non-western reading of the West and paves the way for a history and anthropology of science and European modernity. In 2011, the Indian Sociological Society honored him with the Lifetime Achievement Award.

Education and research
Uberoi was educated at the University College London as an engineer in the 1950s. He later studied anthropology for his masters at the University of Manchester. At Manchester, he studied under the anthropologist Max Gluckman. His graduate work at Manchester culminated in the publication of his first book, Politics of the Kula Ring: An Analysis of the Findings of Bronislaw Malinowski (Manchester University Press), in 1962. He completed his Ph.D. in 1964 in the Department of Anthropology at the Australian National University. He conducted ethnographic research among the Tajiks of Afghanistan, and subsequently wrote and defended a Ph.D. thesis entitled Social Organisation of the Tajiks of Andarab Valley, Afghanistan. He came back to India in the late 1960s, and started a decades-long career of teaching and research at the Delhi University.

Books
 Politics of the Kula Ring: An Analysis of the Findings of Bronislaw Malinowski (1962, Manchester University Press)
 Science and Culture (1978, Oxford University Press)
 The other mind of Europe: Goethe as a Scientist (1984, Oxford University Press)
 Religion, civil society, and the state: a study of Sikhism (1996, Oxford University Press)
 The European Modernity: Science, Truth, and Method (2002, Oxford University Press)

See also
 Science and technology studies in India

References

Social anthropologists
Indian sociologists
Indian anthropologists